Floyd Stone "Pete" Crawford (November 28, 1928 – November 11, 2017) was a Canadian ice hockey player with the Belleville McFarlands. He won a gold medal at the 1959 World Ice Hockey Championships in Prague. He is the father of former NHLers Lou, Bob and Marc Crawford.

References

1928 births
2017 deaths
Canadian ice hockey right wingers
Cornwall Royals (OHL) coaches
Canadian ice hockey coaches
Ice hockey people from Toronto